Abd (also Romanized as ‘Abd) is a village in Surak Rural District, Lirdaf District, Jask County, Hormozgan Province, Iran. At the 2006 census, its population was 443, in 96 families.

References 

Populated places in Jask County